Yassar Mugerwa is a Ugandan professional footballer who plays as a midfielder for KCCA FC.

International career
In January 2014, coach Milutin Sedrojevic, invited him to be included in the Uganda national football team for the 2014 African Nations Championship. The team placed third in the group stage of the competition after beating Burkina Faso, drawing with Zimbabwe and losing to Morocco.

References

Living people
Uganda A' international footballers
2014 African Nations Championship players
Ugandan footballers
Fasil Kenema S.C. players
1994 births

Association football midfielders
Uganda international footballers
Ugandan expatriate sportspeople in South Africa
Expatriate soccer players in South Africa
Expatriate footballers in Ethiopia
Ugandan expatriate footballers
Ugandan expatriate sportspeople in Ethiopia
Uganda Revenue Authority SC players